Zhenru Temple may refer to:

 Zhenru Temple (Jiangxi), in Yongxiu County of Jiujaing, Jiangxi, China
 Zhenru Temple (Jiangsu), in Gaochun District of Nanjing, Jiangsu, China
 Zhenru Temple (Fujian), in Xiapu County of Ningde, Fujian, China
 Zhenru Temple (Shanghai), in Putuo District, Shanghai, China